Løten Fotballklubb is a Norwegian association football club from Løten, Hedmark. The club was founded in 1964.

The men's football team plays in the 4. divisjon, the fifth tier of Norwegian football. It had stints in the 3. divisjon as late as 2006–2010 and a single season in 2018.

References

Official site

Football clubs in Norway
Sport in Hedmark
Løten
1964 establishments in Norway
Association football clubs established in 1964